Sulino  is a village situated in the administrative district of Gmina Choszczno, within Choszczno County, West Pomeranian Voivodeship, in north-western Poland.

See also
 History of Pomerania

References

Sulino